Avenue A may refer to:
 Avenue A (Brooklyn), in Canarsie, Brooklyn, New York City
 Avenue A (Manhattan), in Manhattan, New York City
 Avenue A (Saskatoon), a former name of an arterial road in Saskatoon, Saskatchewan, Canada, presently known as Idylwyld Drive
 Avenue A | Razorfish, an advertising agency, now Razorfish
 Avenue A, a song by Canadian rock music band Red Rider on their 1979 album Don't Fight It